I Wrecked My House is a Canadian home renovation reality series, which airs on HGTV. Hosted by Steve Patterson, the show visits homeowners with poor home renovation skills — people whose abilities are, according to the producers, more MacGyver or Red Green than Mike Holmes — who then receive a professional home renovation from contractor Dave Rannala in collaboration with a local design company.

The series premiered in April 2014 with a one-hour special which profiled five sets of homeowners, while the regular series launched in April 2015 with 14 half-hour episodes profiling a single home per episode.  The show was produced and co-written by Toronto-based producer, Derek Miller.

Patterson garnered a Canadian Screen Award nomination for Best Host in a Variety, Lifestyle, Reality/Competition, or Talk Program or Series at the 3rd Canadian Screen Awards.

References

External links

2014 Canadian television series debuts
2010s Canadian reality television series
HGTV (Canada) original programming
Television shows filmed in Toronto